Frasinu may refer to:

Frasinu, a village in Cornești, Dâmbovița, Romania
Frasinu, a village in Băneasa, Giurgiu, Romania
Frasinu, a village in Poienești Commune, Vaslui County, Romania

See also 
 Frasinu River (disambiguation)
 Frasin (disambiguation)
 Frăsinet (disambiguation)